The Portuguese national debt, the public debt of Portugal, or the debt of the public administrations of Portugal, as any other government debt, is the financial amount the Portuguese State owes, externally and internally, due to its various financial commitments.

By the first semester of 2013, the Portuguese national debt was 130% of the GDP, around 214.5 billion Euros or 293 billion US dollars.

There were two main periods since the early 90s when the debt of Portugal had a strong growth. The first was at the beginning of the third millennium, i.e., from the year 2000 the Portuguese public debt began to have growth that many economists considered worrisome, and that in their opinion would contribute to create a structural crisis in the country. However, the big increase in the public debt, in parallel with the rest of Europe, was post-2008, after the international crisis of the Great Recession which began in 2008, that caused the sovereign debt crisis in the majority of European countries.

As the public debt presented as a % of Gross Domestic Product, it is actually presented as a ratio, as the division between the sovereign debt and the Portuguese GDP multiplied by 100 percent. Therefore, the debt increase after 2008 was also a result of GDP decrease due to economic recession.

As of June 2014, the public debt reached 134% of the GDP.

See also
Eurozone crisis

References

Government debt by country
Government of Portugal
Economy of Portugal